Robert Pearce may refer to:

 Robert Pearce (politician) (1840–1922), British Member of Parliament for Leek, 1906–1910 and 1910–1918
 Bobby Pearce (rower) (1905–1976), Australian-Canadian sculler
 Robert Pearce (wrestler) (1908–1996), American Olympic wrestler
 Bob Pearce (born 1946), politician
 Robert A. Pearce (born 1951), vice-chancellor of the University of Wales, Lampeter, 2003–2008
 Bobby Pearce (designer) (born 1961), American costume designer
 Robert Pearce, associate justice of the Supreme Court of Tasmania

See also
 Robert Pierce (disambiguation)
 Robert Peirce (disambiguation)
 Bobby Pierce (disambiguation)